The Case Farmstead, also known as the Daniel Case / Sarah Clark Case Farmstead, is a historic  farm located along County Route 614 (Little York-Pattenburg Road) near Pattenburg in Union Township, Hunterdon County, New Jersey. It was added to the National Register of Historic Places on August 14, 1979, for its significance in architecture and medicine. The farmstead includes three contributing buildings.

History and description
The two and one-half story stone house was built  with I-house design. Sarah Clark Case (1776–1859) was a nurse and midwife. In 1816, she earned a medical license, issued by the New Jersey Medical Society, and became the first licensed female physician in the county.

See also
 National Register of Historic Places listings in Hunterdon County, New Jersey

References

Union Township, Hunterdon County, New Jersey
Houses in Hunterdon County, New Jersey
Farmhouses in the United States
Stone houses in New Jersey
Houses completed in 1800
1800 establishments in New Jersey
I-houses in New Jersey
National Register of Historic Places in Hunterdon County, New Jersey
Houses on the National Register of Historic Places in New Jersey
New Jersey Register of Historic Places